Richard Foerster may refer to:
 Richard Foerster (poet) (born 1949), American poet
 Richard Foerster (classical scholar) (1843–1922), German scholar
 Richard Foerster (naval officer), German admiral

See also
 Richard Forster (disambiguation)